Shaariibuugiin Altantuyaa (Mongolian: Шаарийбуугийн Алтантуяа; sometimes also Altantuya Shaariibuu; 6 May 1978 – 18 October 2006), a Mongolian national, was a murder victim who was either murdered by PETN and RDX explosives or was somehow killed first and her remains destroyed with explosives on 18 October 2006 in a deserted area in Shah Alam, Malaysia. Her murder case is significant in contemporary Malaysian politics due to the alleged involvement of persons close to the former Malaysian Prime Minister, Najib Razak.

The Shah Alam High Court originally acquitted Abdul Razak Baginda and meted out the death sentence to two of the accused, Chief Inspector Azilah Hadri and Corporal Sirul Azhar Umar, on 9 April 2009, wrapping up the 159-day trial. On 23 August 2013, Sirul and Azilah were acquitted by the Court of Appeal, sparking controversy.  On 13 January 2015, the Federal Court overturned the acquittal of both individuals, finding them both guilty of murder and sentenced both of them to death. However, Sirul fled to Australia and efforts by the Malaysian authorities to extradite him were hampered by existing Australian legislation prohibiting the extradition of individuals to countries with the death penalty.

After the Malaysian 14th general election marking a historic defeat for the ruling Barisan Nasional coalition, Prime Minister Mahathir Mohamad and some relevant parties including Altantuyaa's father have hoped for further investigations to find the motive of murder and bring justice to the case. Sirul said he was willing to reveal what really happened in the murder case provided he was given a full pardon to come back to Malaysia.

On 16 December 2019, convicted killer Azilah Hadri alleged from death row in Kajang Prison that the order to kill Altantuyaa Shaariibuu came from former Prime Minister Najib Razak and the latter's close associate, Abdul Razak Baginda.

Background 

Altantuyaa was born in 1978. She and her sister were raised in the Soviet Union where Altantuyaa attended first grade in elementary school. She was reportedly fluent in Mongolian, Russian, Chinese and English, and knew some French.

Altantuyaa moved back to Mongolia in 1990 and a few years later, married a Mongolian techno singer named Maadai. They had a child in 1996 but the marriage ended in divorce and the child was sent to live with Altantuyaa's parents.  Despite training as a teacher, Altantuyaa briefly relocated to France to attend modelling school, before returning to Mongolia. Her mother has however said that her daughter had, to her knowledge, never worked as a model. 

Altantuyaa remarried and had another child in 2003, but the second marriage also ended in divorce.  The second child was also put in the care of Altantuyaa's parents. She worked as a translator and often travelled out of Mongolia to countries like China, Singapore and Malaysia. Records indicate that she visited Malaysia at least twice; the first time in 1995 and the second in early 2006.

Relations to Najib Razak 
It was alleged that she was introduced by the former Malaysian Prime Minister, Najib Razak, to Abdul Razak Baginda, a defence analyst from the Malaysian Strategic Research Centre, at an international diamond convention in Hong Kong, and had a relationship with Baginda while accompanying him to Paris to work as a translator during his negotiations to purchase s from France for the Malaysian government. Hong Kong-based news website Asia Sentinel revealed in a series of photographs that Altantuyaa was in France during which time the two quickly became romantically involved.

However, Raja Petra Kamaruddin, the Malaysia Today editor, was the one who connected Najib Razak with the Altantuyaa murders. Najib Razak denied all allegations as there were no concrete proof about him knowing Altantuyaa. Raja Petra retracted his allegation of the involvement of Najib Razak and Rosmah Mansor after the case were brought to court. Afraid of being prosecuted by the Malaysian courts for giving a false statement, Raja Petra fled to England, leaving his wife and children behind. In addition, a former aide to Datuk Seri Anwar Ibrahim, Muhamad Rahimi Osman, claimed that Sirul's family was enticed to make a false statement that Najib was involved in Altantuyaa's murder.

According to reports by the French newspaper Liberation, Altantuyaa found out that one of the parties involved in negotiations, French company Armaris, paid out commissions of 114 million euros for the deal (reportedly one billion euros or RM4.7 billion for the purchase of three submarines). The commission was credited in the accounts of a company controlled by Abdul Razak, Perimekar. A letter written by Altantuyaa and found after her death shows that she had been blackmailing Mr. Baginda, seeking US$500,000 to remain silent about her knowledge of the deal. SUARAM secretariat, Cynthia Gabriel, commented that the Paris Courts have "extended its investigations with circumstances that led to Altantuyaa's death. However, the French Courts are not investigating the murder of Altantuyaa as its focus is on the alleged corruption conducted by DCNS with regards to the sale of the Scorpène submarines, but would deliberate on the murder in the course of the inquiry. On 25 June 2012, a French police investigation revealed that there were no immigration records of an “Altantuyaa Shaariibuu” entering France from 1999 to 2006. The same report noted instead the entry of a SHAARIYBUU Bayasgalan, who bore similarities to, but was not conclusively identified as Altantuyaa, as well as pointed out that Najib's entourage might have entered France through diplomatic channels as there was evidence of his presence but no corresponding immigration record. During the trial into Altantuyaa's death, Baginda told investigators that he had travelled with her to France in 2005. Records seized by French investigators from DCN's former financial chief described Altantuyaa as Baginda's translator. On the other hand, Rosana Weili, the Director of Perimekar, claimed that the negotiations were conducted in English as the French negotiators spoke English. Rosana also had "no knowledge of anyone by the name of Altantuyaa" in the negotiation team.

An article from The Star reported that when the deal was signed on 5 June 2002 between the Malaysian government and the submarine manufacturers, Abdul Razak Baginda had not met Altantuyaa as they only met two years after the agreement was signed.

Murder 

When it was realised she was missing on 19 October 2006, her cousin lodged a police report and sought help from the Mongolian embassy in Bangkok.  The Malaysian police found fragments of bone, later verified as hers, in forested land near the Subang Dam in Puncak Alam, Shah Alam. Police investigation of her remains revealed that she was shot twice before C-4 explosives were used on her remains, although there has been later suggestion that the C-4 explosives may have killed her. However, lab results confirmed the explosives used was PETN and RDX, a type of explosive used in quarries which could have been sourced from nearby quarries. When her remains were found their identity could only be confirmed with a DNA test.

Members of the police force were arrested during the murder investigation. The two murder suspects have been named as Chief Inspector Azilah Hadri, 30, and Corporal Sirul Azhar Umar, 35. They had been members of the elite Special Actions Unit and were both assigned, albeit as bodyguards, to the office of the Prime Minister, Abdullah Ahmad Badawi. Abdul Razak has been charged with abetting the murder.

Trial and verdict

Trial 
According to court testimony by Altantuyaa's cousin Burmaa Oyunchimeg, Altantuyaa had shown Burmaa a photograph of 3 persons taking a meal together: Altantuyaa, Razak Baginda, and a government official. When questioned by the lawyer of the victim's family, Karpal Singh, Burmaa identified the official as then Deputy Prime Minister, Najib Tun Razak.

On 22 July 2008, Karpal Singh, who also holds a watching brief for the victim's family, filed a notice of motion to call 4 new witnesses, including Datuk Seri Najib Tun Razak, to testify in the trial, as well as sought to recall the first prosecution witness in the trial, private detective P. Balasubramaniam, for further examination. According to Karpal, Najib's testimony would be able to introduce fresh evidence to the case, and his requests were justifiable as per Section 425 of the Criminal Procedure Code (CPC), which allows a court to "summon or recall any person as a witness in a trial", as well as "summon or recall any such person if his evidence appears to the court to be essential to the just decision of the case." On 23 July 2008, the petition notice was rejected by the High Court. The High Court judge, Mohd Zaki, stated that "only the parties involved, namely the prosecution and the defence" had a right to submit the petition.

Acquittal of Abdul Razak Baginda 
On 31 October 2008, the High Court acquitted Abdul Razak Baginda of abetment in the murder of Altantuyaa, with the prosecution saying they would appeal the acquittal. As of March 2009, the appeal had yet to transpire. However in a development 13 years later at a court hearing in the civil case brought against former policemen Azilah Hadri and Sirul Azhar Umar, as well as Najib and the Malaysian government by Altantuya's father, incriminating evidence emerged against Baginda. The court was told in May 2022 that on the day of her disappearance, Altantuyaa had made a police report in which she suggested that authorities "look for Razak Baginda" if anything should happen to her.

Defence and witness 
Chief Inspector Azilah Hadri and Corporal Sirul Azhar Umar were ordered to enter their defence and testify under oath. On 10 November 2008, it was announced that the murder trial has been postponed to January 2009 to allow the defence more time to prepare and gather witnesses. The witnesses sought included Malaysia Today editor, Raja Petra Kamarudin and private investigator, P. Balasubramaniam, who was unlocatable at that time.

The request by the defence counsel for Sirul Azhar and Azilah to get statements from all prosecution witnesses was rejected with the reason given that "witness statements recorded under Section 112 of the Criminal Procedure Code is privileged". This would have included the witness statement of Deputy Prime Minister Datuk Seri Najib Razak's former aide-de-camp DSP Musa Safri, which would have been used to rebut Abdul Razak's affidavit.

On 3 February 2009, Sirul Azhar pleaded with the court to not pass the death sentence on him, as he was like "a black sheep that has to be sacrificed" to protect unnamed people who have never been brought to court or faced questioning. "I have no reason to cause hurt, what's more to take the life of the victim in such a cruel manner... I appeal to the court, which has the powers to determine if I live or die, not to sentence me so as to fulfil others' plans for me."

Death sentence 
On 9 April 2009, High Court Judge Zaki Yasin ruled that Sirul Azhar's and Azilah's statements were  "unbelievable" as both of the accused only blamed each other. Both policemen were sentenced to death for the murder of Altantuyaa. Wrapping up the 159-day trial, Zaki said both of them failed to raise any reasonable doubt in the prosecution's case. However, their lawyers planned to file an appeal. Both policemen showed no emotion when they heard that they were sentenced to be hanged until dead. Their family members accept the court's decision and denied any political elements in the verdict. The two policemen appealed their sentence in late August.  The Court of Appeal has fixed a date for their appellate hearing for 10 June 2013.

Shariibuu Setev's lawyers have applied for a review the Attorney-General's decision not to appeal Abdul Razak Baginda's acquittal in the murder of Shariibuu's daughter, Altantuyaa. The application was set to be heard at the High Court on 8 July 2009. Dr. Shariibuu later withdrew the application but said he would still proceed with the claim against Abdul Razak, Azilah, Sirul Azhar, and the Government of Malaysia for damages over Altantuyaa's death.

Sirul and Azilah were acquitted on 23 August 2013 by the Court of Appeal.  Several reasons were given for the acquittal such as the failure of the prosecution to provide a strong motive for the two men to murder the victim and the failure to call for the cross-examination of Najib's aide Musa Safri and Najib Razak.  The acquittals drew the derision of Altantuyaa's father, and many Malaysians.

The prosecution immediately made an appeal to the Federal Court over the acquittal of the Azhar and Sirul which was heard on 23 June 2014.  The Federal Court on 13 January 2015 overturned the acquittal of both individuals, finding them both guilty of murder and sentenced both of them to death. It was later discovered that Sirul did not show up during the appeal hearing and was believed to be in Australia. The Inspector-General of Police, Tan Sri Khalid Abu Bakar, has made an extradition request to Australia calling for Sirul, but faces difficulty as Australian law does not allow for the extradition of individuals to another jurisdiction if they could be sentenced to death. Sirul was detained by Australian immigration authorities in Brisbane, Queensland, on 20 January 2015 after an Interpol red notice was issued for his arrest.

Finding the motive of murder 
Three years after the Federal Court found both policemen guilty of murder and sentenced them to death, Dr Shaariibuu Setev, the father of Altantuyaa, made a report to request the police to reopen the case of the murder as his lawyer Ramkarpal said that the motive of the murder needed to be investigated and who ordered the killing be brought to justice.

Prime Minister Tun Dr Mahathir Mohamad, who led Pakatan Harapan to defeat Barisan Nasional in the 14th General Election (GE14) on 9 May 2018, said the murder case should be reopened and agreed that it warranted further investigation.

After the GE14, Mongolian President Khaltmaagiin Battulga asked Dr Mahathir Mohamad to help bring justice in the murder case of Altantuyaa while Malaysian political leader Anwar Ibrahim said Sirul should face a new trial as the judges' ruling was compromised and the reluctance of the judges to call relevant witnesses made a mockery of the law.

Azilah's death sentence finalized
On 8 December 2020, Azilah had lost his appeal, in which he sought a re-trial and review of his conviction and sentence. The Federal Court of Malaysia dismissed the appeal as they found the case does not carry any breach or miscarriage of justice to warrant a review of the case. This particular appeal was Azilah's final legal attempt to escape from the gallows, and the failure of the appeal had effectively finalized Azilah's death sentence, confirming the former police officer to hang on a later date for Altantuyaa's murder. Azilah remains on death row since 8 December 2020.

Controversies

Statutory declaration by Raja Petra 

In a statutory declaration in his sedition trial in June 2008, Raja Petra said that he was "reliably informed" that Rosmah Mansor (the wife of Malaysia's Deputy Prime Minister, Najib Razak) was one of three individuals who were present at the crime scene when Altantuyaa Shaariibuu was murdered on 19 October 2006. He wrote that Najib's wife, Rosmah Mansor, and Acting Colonel Abdul Aziz Buyong and his wife, Norhayati, Rosmah's aide-de-camp, were present at the scene of the murder and that Abdul Aziz Buyong was the individual who placed C4 plastic explosive on Altantuya's body and blew it up.  Dr Shaariibuu Setev, the father of Altantuyaa Shaariibuu, has asked the police to conduct a thorough investigation into an allegation by Raja Petra saying the police should look seriously into the allegations as it might provide them with fresh evidence in their case.

In retaliation, the two people named in Raja Petra's statutory declaration on 18 June 2008, Lt-Col Abdul Aziz Buyong and his wife Lt-Col Norhayati Hassan, as having been present at the murder scene of Mongolian Altantuyaa Shaariibuu are suing Raja Petra for defamation. Abdul Aziz is seeking an apology from Raja Petra to be published in certain websites and newspapers, the removal of the statutory declaration from his blog and damages of RM1 million.
Raja Petra's counsel, J. Chandra, later insinuated that the article titled ‘Let's send the Altantuyaa murderers to hell’ on 25 April under Raja Petra's byline was posted without his consent or knowledge.

Raja Petra appeared to have distanced himself from the statutory declaration in a television interview with TV3, saying its accusations linking Najib Razak and Rosmah Mansor to the murder were repeating information passed onto him by opposition figures, rather than information he knew to be true himself. He appeared to have stated that he did not genuinely believe that Rosmah was at the murder scene. The Malaysian Civil Liberties Movement alleged that the interview had been heavily edited and spin doctored in favour of Prime Minister Najib Razak just in time for the upcoming Sarawak state elections. Raja Petra also denied that he did not believe Rosmah was at the scene saying that the interview was "chopped up". He also later clarified and pointed out that he had always been consistent in relation to the statutory declaration, saying that he had never directly accused Rosmah of being at the scene of the murder, merely repeating what was told to him.

Statutory declaration by P. Balasubramaniam 
A second statutory declaration was filed on 1 July 2008 by Abdul Razak Baginda's private investigator P. Balasubramaniam, disclosing then deputy Prime Minister Najib's links and Altantuyaa. Bala said the police omitted information about the relationship between Najib and Altantuyaa during their investigation. In the statutory declaration Abdul Razak had told Balasubramaniam that the deputy prime minister had a sexual relationship with Altantuyaa and that the trio had dined together in Paris. Detailed conversations in a statutory declaration revealed that Abdul Razak had in effect inherited Altantuyaa as a lover from Najib, who passed her on because he did not want to be harassed as a deputy prime minister. Among other lurid details, Balasubramaniam described text messages between Najib and Abdul Razak in which the latter was asking for help to avoid arrest, implying Najib personally interfered with the murder investigation. In making his statutory declaration, Balasubramaniam mentioned that a man in a blue Proton Saga happened to be driving past the home of defense analyst Abdul Razak Baginda at that time of the day before Altantuyaa was reported missing on 19 October 2006 and revealed that the man was Nasir Safar, the special advisor to Najib Razak.

Former deputy Prime Minister, Anwar Ibrahim, has called for a Royal Commission of Inquiry to look into the case. However, the RCI has not been convened on this issue.

It has been claimed that Balasubramaniam's allegation on the involvement of Najib Razak on the murders of Altantuyaa could have political motivations, as the press conference for the allegation was made at the national PKR Headquarters.

Retraction and disappearance 
The following day Balasubramaniam retracted the statutory declaration he made on 1 July 2008 proffered a second statutory declaration and that erased all traces of allegations that referred to Deputy Prime Minister Datuk Seri Najib Tun Razak and Altantuyaa Shaariibuu's murder. There were accusations that this new statutory declaration could have been due to intimidation or inducement, and was done not on his own free will. Bala's first lawyer Americk Singh Sidhu said he was not able to get in touch with Bala despite repeated phone calls to Bala's cell phone  The Malaysian police said on Sunday 6 July that they have asked Interpol to help find the private investigator who had been reported missing since making explosive claims linking the deputy premier to a murder. Bala's nephew filed a missing person's report saying the investigator and his family had disappeared. It was discovered on 10 July that Balasubramaniam's house in Taman Pelangi had been broken into, but police have yet to ascertain whether anything was stolen. Balasubramaniam was said to have taken refuge in a neighbouring country with his wife and children.

It is assumed that Bala was running away because he either received death threats or a massive bribe from Najib.

Reappearance and retraction of second statutory declaration 
After his reappearance, Bala claimed that he signed the second statutory declaration without even reading it, claiming he was threatened. Bala also said that a member of Najib's family, Najib's younger brother Nazim Abdul Razak, teaming up with Deepak Jaikishan, a businessman with connections to Najib Razak's family, made Bala withdraw his first statutory declaration and offered him RM5 million to do so, but that his first declaration was true.  Balasubramaniam has declined to meet the Malaysian Anti-Corruption Commission in Singapore to give his testimony about allegations surrounding the murder of Altantuyaa Shaariibuu as he has made his personal security a prerequisite for his testimony. The MACC also wanted to classify all correspondences between Balasubramaniam and their organisation as ‘secrets’ under the Official Secrets Act, which according to Bala's lawyer there was a disagreement to this demand.

Bala continued to reiterate that the first statutory declaration he signed was the truth.  He actively campaigned for the Malaysian opposition giving talks on Najib and Rosmah's alleged role in the death of Altantuyaa  until his eventual death by heart attack on 15 March 2013.

Deepak Jaikishan 
Malaysian businessman Deepak Jaikishan in the later part of 2012 held several press conferences regarding his role in the retraction of Balasubramaniam's first statutory declaration and the supposed coercion in making Bala sign the second declaration. He also made damning accusations against Prime Minister Najib Razak and his wife Rosmah Mansor, implying they were the ones giving instructions and had prior knowledge of coverup of the first statutory declaration. He further revealed that it was the Prime Minister's brother Nazim Abdul Razak who paid off Balasubramaniam. In a biography launched on 19 March 2013, Rosmah Mansor denied any involvement with the murder of Altantuya, stating that she was attending a special session with the Islamic Orphans Welfare Association on the day in question, and describing the accusations against her as "slander".

Deepak has also made claims denying that he is not currently being sponsored by the Malaysian opposition Pakatan Rakyat or its leader Anwar Ibrahim, despite claims by certain parties that he is. Deepak has expressed regret in being involved in the Altantuyaa affair. Anwar has continually denied that he is behind the recent exposes by Deepak. The revelations come at the same time when Deepak is being involved in a lawsuit against the government and governing party UMNO in a land deal case. He also said that the Malaysian Anti-Corruption Commission(MACC) is more interested in ignoring this matter rather than starting an investigation.

He made further references to the lawyer duo who were involved in the drafting the second statutory declaration, implying they came from the law firm of Zul Rafique & Partners of Kuala Lumpur. It was later inferred to the Malaysian Bar Council by several parties, including activist Haris Ibrahim  and Robert Phang that the lawyer duo was Tan Sri Cecil Abraham and his son. The Bar Council has promised to begin investigations into the drafting of the second statutory declaration.  Bala's lawyer, Americk Sidhu, revealed in a Bar Council investigation hearings that Cecil Abraham confirmed to him that he was the one who drafted Bala's second statutory declaration under instructions from Najib himself. A professional misconduct complaint will be lodged against Cecil Abraham by the Bar Council, whereby under the Legal Profession Act he could be reprimanded, fined and suspended from practice for up to five years.

Sirul Azhar 
Sirul Azhar, the former police commando, who was convicted for the murder of Altantuyaa, revealed during his detention in Australia that he was under orders to kill Altantuyaa and that the real murderers were still free. He also mentioned that Najib's aide-de camp Musa Safri and his superior should have been made to testify during the murder trial. Sirul's claims have been immediately rubbished by Najib and Inspector General of Police Khalid Abu Bakar. The opposition has asked Najib to explain why he was asserting that Sirul's claims were "total rubbish". In January 2016, Sirul Azhar denied that Najib Razak involved in the murder case.

Further revelations 
A lawyer for Chief Inspector Azilah Hadri said the type of explosives used in the murder of Mongolian national Altantuyaa Shaariibuu is not in the stock of federal police headquarters Bukit Aman. “Azilah's log record from Bukit Aman shows that he was only issued with a Glock pistol and magazines. Hence, there is a question as to how this type of explosive was allegedly used," said lawyer Hazman Ahmad. In addition, both Sirul and Azilah are not trained to handle explosives and bombs such as the C4.

In an investigative news report 101 East by Al Jazeera, an interview of a purported relative of Sirul called 'Frank' claimed that Sirul mentioned to him that Razak Baginda was the person who shot and killed Altantuyaa. The documentary also alleged that the-then Deputy Prime Minister Najib Tun Razak had an extramarital affair with the victim prior to her death. The Australian journalist  Mary Ann Jolley, who did the report, was deported from Malaysia on June 14, 2015 by the Malaysian authorities, alleging she had tarnished Malaysia's image. Following the airing of the documentary on 10 September 2015, the Malaysian Prime Minister's Department and the former Inspector-General of Police, Musa Hassan, both issued statements contesting the report's assertions.

In an interview with The Malaysian Insider, Abdul Razak Baginda claimed that Altantuyaa Shaariibuu was blackmailing him for amounts in the US$5,000 to US$8,000 range on personal matters, which prompted him to enlist Deputy Superintendent Musa Safri for help, and hire private investigator P. Balasubramaniam for protection. Altantuyaa was later murdered, allegedly under police custody of Sirul Azhar and Azilah Hadri. Both were convicted for the murder from the physical evidence found in Sirul's car, Sirul's house, and an account that they both were present at the hotel Altantuyaa stayed, and outside of Razak's house. Sirul denied Musa Safri's involvement, and Abdul Razak Baginda was acquitted of murder due to reasonable doubt raised from the record of 144 telephone calls and SMSes made between him and Musa Safri. Abdul Razak Baginda also denied the murder was related to his submarine deal, and claimed P. Balasubramaniam's statutory declaration, that implicated the Deputy Prime Minister, was based on hearsay.

See also
 1Malaysia Development Berhad scandal

References

External links
 "Brutal Murder of a Mongolian Beauty", The Straits Times, Singapore
 "Who was Altantuya Shaariibuu?", Asia Sentinel
 Extradition of Sirul Azhar Umar
Murder in Malaysia. Al Jazeera English, September 2015 (video, 26 mins)
"The Girl Who Knew Too Much", Asia Sentinel

Deaths by person in Malaysia
Political scandals in Malaysia
2000s in Kuala Lumpur
Crime in Kuala Lumpur
2006 murders in Malaysia
Malaysian police officers convicted of murder
Police officers convicted of murder
Female murder victims
2000s in Malaysia